Scown is a surname.

Notable people with this surname include:
 Alistair Scown, New Zealand rugby player
 Percy Scown (1883-1966), Australian footballer
 Rebecca Scown (born 1983), New Zealand rower
 Shelley Scown, Australian singer
 Sonia Scown, maiden name of Sonia Waddell (born 1973), New Zealand athlete